The 1993 Base Realignment and Closure Commission preliminary list was released by the United States Department of Defense in 1993 as part of the Base Realignment and Closure Commission. It recommended closing 33 major United States military bases.

Commissioners
Chairman:  Jim Courter
Commissioner:  CAPT Peter B. Bowman, USN (Ret)
Commissioner:  Beverly B. Byron
Commissioner:  Rebecca G. Cox
Commissioner:  GEN H.T. Johnson, USAF (Ret)
Commissioner:  Harry C. McPherson Jr.
Commissioner:  Robert D. Stuart Jr.

Justifications

Recommendations
Major facilities slated for closure included:
Camp Evans
Fort Wingate
Griffiss Air Force Base
Homestead Air Force Base
K.I. Sawyer Air Force Base
March Air Force Base
Mare Island Naval Shipyard
Marine Corps Air Station El Toro
Naval Air Station Agana
Naval Air Station Alameda
Naval Air Station Barbers Point
Naval Air Station Cecil Field
Naval Air Station Dallas
Naval Air Station Glenview
Naval Air Warfare Center Trenton
Naval Aviation Depot Alameda
Naval Aviation Depot Norfolk
Naval Aviation Depot Pensacola
Naval Electronic Systems Engineering Center, Saint Inigoes
Naval Hospital Charleston
Naval Hospital Oakland
Naval Hospital Orlando
Naval Station Argentia
Naval Station Charleston
Naval Station Mobile
Naval Station Staten Island
Naval Station Treasure Island
Naval Supply Center, Oakland
Naval Training Center Orlando
Naval Training Center San Diego
Newark Air Force Base
O'Hare Air Reserve Station
Plattsburgh Air Force Base
Vint Hill Farms Station

See also
 Loss of Strength Gradient

References

External links
 Defense Base Closure and Realignment Commission 1993 Report to the President 
 

1993 in the United States
Base Realignment and Closure Commission